Imangali Nurgaliuly Tasmagambetov (İmаnğаli Nūrğаliūly Таsmаğаmbеtоv, ; born 9 December 1956) is a Kazakh politician and diplomat, who is the current Secretary-General of the Collective Security Treaty Organization since January 2023. He was the Kazakh Ambassador to Russia from 2017 to 2019. He was Deputy Prime Minister of Kazakhstan from 2016 to 2017 and Minister of Defense of Kazakhstan from 2014 to 2016. He was the akim of Astana from 2008 to 2014 and from 2004 to 2008, as akim of Almaty. Before that, from 2002 to 2003, he was the Prime Minister of Kazakhstan.

Tasmagambetov stated that he resigned as PM after finding out about the falsification of a positive vote of confidence in his administration that was taken on 19 May 2003. His resignation resulted in the dismissal of all members of his cabinet, as required by the Constitution of Kazakhstan.

President Nursultan Nazarbayev replaced Tasmagambetov with Pavlodar Region Akim Daniyal Akhmetov on 13 June 2003. Akhmetov pledged to maintain many of Tasmagambetov's policies.

Tasmagambetov has been appointed as head of KazakhGolf Federation on May 18, 2022.

Early life and career 
Tasmagambetov was born in the village of Novobogat in Atyrau Region to Nurgali Tasmagambetov (1926–1997) and Dilda Qoqanova (1930–2019). In 1979, he graduated from the natural-geographical faculty of the West Kazakhstan State University, specializing in "teacher of geography and biology." In 1990, Tasmagambetov earned Ph.D in philosophy in his thesis "World outlook aspects of ecological problems". In 1997, he earned doctorate in political science in his dissertation “Social Policy in Transit Political Systems”.

Tasmagambetov began his career in 1973 as a boxing and wrestling trainer at a Children's and Youth Sports School in the village of Makhambet. After graduating, he worked as a teacher of geography and biology at the Makhambet Secondary School.

Early political career 
In 1989, Tasmagambetov was elected as the First Secretary of the Central Committee of the Komsomol in Kazakh SSR. In 1991, he became a chairman of the State Committee of the Republic of Kazakhstan on Youth Affairs.

From 1993 to 1995, Tasmagambetov worked as an assistant to the President of Kazakhstan. On 13 March 1995, he became the Deputy Prime Minister of Kazakhstan and from 17 March 1997, he served as the Minister of Education and Culture. That same year, Tasmagambetov was appointed as the Deputy Head of the Presidential Administration of Kazakhstan and the head of the Organizational and Control Department of the Presidential Administration. In 1998, he became the First Assistant to the President.

On 18 February 1999, Tasmagambetov was appointed as the akim of Atyrau Region and from 17 December 2000, he served as the Deputy Prime Minister in the 4th government.

Prime Minister of Kazakhstan (2002–2003) 

On 28 January 2002, Tasmagambetov was nominated as the Prime Minister of Kazakhstan by President Nursultan Nazarbayev, who was unanimously approved by the Parliament. While serving as the PM, he faced controversy over the issue privatization of land that was supposedly favor the wealthy. Tasmagambetov announced his resignation on 11 June 2003, stating that the parliamentary vote of no confidence that took place on 19 May 2003 was falsified. As a result, he was appointed as the State Secretary of Kazakhstan on 13 June 2003.

Post-Premiership 

He served that position until he was dismissed on 9 March 2004. The following day on 10 March, Tasmagambetov was appointed as the head of the Presidential Administration of Kazakhstan and was removed from the post on 7 December 2004.

Äkim of Almaty (2004–2008) 
On 8 December 2004, Tasmagambetov became the äkim of Almaty. Under his tenure, a first recycling waste plant was opened in the country. 2.5 million square meters of housing were built (18,202 apartments). Five schools and outbuildings were opened, two kindergartens were commissioned, and three health facilities were built. Restoration work was carried out on 33 monuments of history and culture.

Äkim of Astana (2008–2014) 
From 4 April 2008, he served as the akim of Astana. While holding that post, Tasmagambetov was chosen to be the chairman of the Astana City Branch of Nur Otan on 19 May 2008. Astana became the first place in the provision of housing to the population. The number of problem sites was reduced from 243 to two. In 2012–2013, two hospitals and two polyclinics were commissioned. The opera and ballet theater Astana Opera and the Palace of Schoolchildren were built, while the construction of the cathedral mosque Hazrat Sultan Mosque began. A locomotive plant, a plant for the production of reinforced concrete products, pipes made of polymer materials, and  helicopter plant were commissioned and put into operation.

Defense and Deputy Minister (2014–2017) 
From 22 October 2014 to 12 September 2016, Tasmagambetov served as a Minister of Defense under Massimov. The following day on 13 September, he was appointed as a Deputy Prime Minister again in Sagintayev's cabinet.

Ambassador of Kazakhstan to Russia (2017–2019) 
On 3 February 2017, Tasmagambetov became an Ambassador of Kazakhstan to Russia to where he presented his credentials to Russian President Vladimir Putin on 16 March 2017. His sudden appointment to the position led to suspicions that Nazarbayev felt politically threatened by his ally, as the move rendered Tasmagambetov constitutionally prohibited from running for President. He served in the role until 18 December 2019, when by the decree of President Kassym-Jomart Tokayev, Tasmagambetov was removed from his post, dismissed from public service and sent to a retirement pension.

Secretary General of CSTO (2023–) 
On 1 January 2023, Imangali Tasmagambetov started his term as the Secretary General of CSTO, replacing Belarussian Stanislav Zas and making him the first Kazakhstani person to hold the title.

Awards

Kazakhstan 
 Order of Parasat
 Order of Nazarbayev
 Medal "10 years of Astana"
 Order of Barys
 Medal "20 years of independence of the Republic of Kazakhstan"

Foreign 
 Order of Friendship (Russia)
 Order of Holy Prince Daniel of Moscow (Russia)
 Order of "Glory and Honor" (Russia)

References

1956 births
Living people
Prime Ministers of Kazakhstan
Mayors of Astana
Mayors of Almaty
Nur Otan politicians
Ministers of Defence of Kazakhstan
People from Atyrau Region
Deputy Prime Ministers of Kazakhstan